Ithramathram is a Malayalam film directed by K. Gopinathan from a screenplay adapted from Kalpatta Narayanan's novel of the same name. The film takes a closer look into the life of a 38-year-old woman living in a sleepy village in Wayanad, on her death, from the memories of a few persons who were part of her life. The film stars Biju Menon, Swetha Menon and Malavika in pivotal roles. The film released on 14 September 2012 to mixed reviews. It won the FIPRESCI Award for Best Malayalam Film at the 17th International Film Festival of Kerala.

Cast
 Biju Menon as Vasudevan
 Swetha Menon as Sumithra
 K. P. A. C. Lalitha as Marlyamma
 Nedumudi Venu as Gowdar
 Siddique as Poduval
 Anoop Chandran as Dasan
 V. K. Sreeraman as Kaaranavar
 Malavika Nair as Anasooya

Awards
International Film Festival of Kerala - 2012
FIPRESCI Award for Best Malayalam Film – (K. Gopinath)
2nd South Indian International Movie Awards
 Nominated—Best Actress - Swetha Menon

References

External links

2010s Malayalam-language films
Films based on Indian novels